Halesowen and Rowley Regis is a constituency in the West Midlands represented in the House of Commons of the UK Parliament since 2010 by James Morris, a Conservative.

Members of Parliament

Boundaries 

Halesowen and Rowley Regis straddles the borders of Dudley and Sandwell. It covers the south-east part of the Dudley borough.

2010–present: The Metropolitan Borough of Dudley wards of Belle Vale, Halesowen North, Halesowen South, and Hayley Green and Cradley South, and the Metropolitan Borough of Sandwell wards of Blackheath, Cradley Heath and Old Hill, and Rowley.

1997–2010: The Metropolitan Borough of Dudley wards of Belle Vale and Hasbury, Halesowen North, Halesowen South, and Hayley Green, and the Metropolitan Borough of Sandwell wards of Blackheath, Cradley Heath and Old Hill, and Rowley.

History 
The constituency was formed for the 1997 general election, taking in the eastern part of the former Halesowen and Stourbridge constituency and the western part of the former Warley West seat. Halesowen and Stourbridge had been held by a Conservative but Labour candidates took its two replacements in 1997.

The area formerly in the Halesowen and Stourbridge constituency is in the Dudley borough, while the area formerly in Warley West is within the Sandwell borough (which in turn had formed part of the boroughs of Warley and originally Rowley Regis).

From 1997 until she stood down before the 2010 general election, the seat's MP was Sylvia Heal of the Labour Party. Heal held Mid Staffordshire from a 1990 by-election until she was defeated by the Conservatives in 1992. On becoming the MP for Halesowen and Rowley Regis, she gained more than half of the votes in 1997 and 2001, before her popularity dipped slightly in 2005, still managing to hold on to the constituency comfortably.

James Morris of the Conservative Party won the seat in the 2010 general election. With approximately half of the constituency situated within Sandwell borough, it was the first time that any part of the borough had been represented by a Conservative MP since its creation in 1974. Morris was voted by the local party as Conservative candidate for the seat after previous candidate Nigel Hastilow stepped down in November 2007 following a public outcry over his claims that Enoch Powell's Rivers of Blood speech had been proven correct.

Elections

Elections in the 2010s

Elections in the 2000s

Elections in the 1990s

See also 
 List of parliamentary constituencies in the West Midlands (county)

Notes

References

Sources
BBC (2005). Election 2005 - Halesowen & Rowley Regis. Retrieved May 9, 2005.

Parliamentary constituencies in the West Midlands (county)
Politics of Dudley
Politics of Sandwell
Constituencies of the Parliament of the United Kingdom established in 1997